Empuriabrava is a community in the municipality of Castelló d'Empúries, in the Alt Empordà (Costa Brava, province of Girona, Catalonia, Spain). It is located in the Gulf of Roses, surrounded by the Natural Park of the Aiguamolls de l'Empordà, and is the largest residential marina in Europe, with some 24 km of navigable waterways.

Originally built on a swamp, Empuriabrava was transformed into a tourist community, initially planned in 1964 and completed in 1975.  The town has more than 40 km of canals and a seasonal, summer population of around 80,000.  The Greco-Roman acropolis of Sant Martí d'Empúries is nearby.

Its aerodrome (ICAO-code LEAP), immediately to the north of the town, offers a variety of air sports with services for all levels of skydiving.

Transport and communications

Roads
From Europe: Crossing the French border by motorway AP-7 or state road N-II. The exit of the motorway is the nº 3. State road C-260, direction Figueres. The road that takes to our municipality is the C-260, taking the Figueres-Roses exit, direction Roses.
From Barcelona or Girona: By motorway AP-7 or state road N-II. The exit of the motorway is the nº 4. State road C-260, direction France. The road that takes to our municipality is the C-260, taking the Figueres-Roses exit, direction Roses.
From the Pyrenees: State road N-260, direction Figueres. After Navata, turn right, the road C-26 direction Castelló d'Empúries. Then, the state road N-II direction France. The road that takes to our municipality is the C-260, taking the Figueres-Roses exit, direction Roses.

Bus
Bus from Barcelona: Barcelona-Castelló d'Empúries-Empuriabrava.
Bus from Girona: Girona-Castelló d'Empúries-Empuriabrava.
Bus from Girona Airport: Aeroport de Girona-Empuriabrava (only summer).
Bus from Barcelona Airport: Bus Barcelona Airport - Figueres and after bus Figueres - Castelló d’Empúries - Empuriabrava

Train
The nearest train station (RENFE) is in Figueres, 15 km from the municipality. From there, bus towards Castelló d'Empúries and Empuriabrava.

AVE and TGV trains arrive at the Figueres-Vilafant railway station. From there, there are bus back to the bus Station in Figueres, and from the Bus Station, there are buses to Castelló d'Empúries and Empuriabrava.

Airports
Girona Airport: The nearest airport is Girona-Costa Brava, an important base for Ryanair. During the summer season, a bus to the town is available.
Additionally, the major international airport at Barcelona-El Prat is located 160 km to the south, around two hours by car.
Empuriabrava Aerodrome: In Empuriabrava there is also an aerodrome, Skydive Empuriabrava.

Boat
Port of Empuriabrava: 42° 14′ Latitude N – 3° 08′ Length E. VHF Channel 9-16. 5000 moorings for boats of up to 26 m in length.

References

External links

Official Tourism Web
Interactive Map Guide of Empuriabrava (Costa Brava)

Alt Empordà
1975 establishments in Spain
Articles containing video clips